John Thomas Allan Dibblee (October 20, 1856 – January 31, 1915) was a hardware merchant and political figure in New Brunswick, Canada. He represented Carleton County in the Legislative Assembly of New Brunswick from 1892 to 1899 as a Liberal-Conservative member.

He was born on October 20, 1856 in Woodstock, New Brunswick to Ann Barker and William Fyler Dibblee. He was educated in Carleton County. Dibblee married Maria Ellegood. They had seven children. He served on the town council and was mayor of Woodstock in 1890 and 1891.

Notes
1. Carleton County sent two representatives to the Legislative Assembly during Dibblee's tenure. In 1892, Dibblee and Henry A. Connell succeeded George R. Ketchum and Marcus C. Atkinson.

References 
The Canadian parliamentary companion, 1897, JA Gemmill

1856 births
1915 deaths
Hardware merchants
Mayors of Woodstock, New Brunswick
Members of the Legislative Assembly of New Brunswick
19th-century Canadian businesspeople